Galgauska Parish is an administrative unit of Gulbene District, Latvia.

Towns, villages and settlements of Galgauska parish

References 

Parishes of Latvia
Gulbene Municipality